Events from the year 1678 in Sweden

Incumbents
 Monarch – Charles XI

Events

 18 January - Battle of Warksow
 Siege of Bohus Fortress.
 Medevi is founded.

 
 Swedish Pomerania is occupied by Brandenburg.

Births

 Maria Faxell, war heroine (died 1738)

Deaths

References

 
Years of the 17th century in Sweden
Sweden